Rissiam is a village in the Kongoussi Department of Bam Province in northern Burkina Faso. It has a population of 978.

It is located approximately 20 km southwest of Lake Bam.

A distinguishing feature is a series of soil erosion control measures built from 1989 onwards, that have stabilised gullies in a seasonal river channel, and farmers' fields.

References

External links
Satellite map at Maplandia.com

Populated places in the Centre-Nord Region
Bam Province